El Hentati Mosque '  is a small mosque in the west of the medina of Tunis, in souk El Leffa.

Localization 
It is located in 88 Souk El Leffa.

History 
The mosque was built during the Hafsid era, in which Ibadi was spread in Tunis. Nowadays, Ibadi can be found mainly in Djerba.

Etymology 
According to Ibn Khaldoun, the name Hentati comes from the Hintata tribe led by Abu Hafs Umar ibn Yahia El Hintati, the first emir of Ifriqiya and the Hafsid dynasty.

References 

Mosques in the medina of Tunis
11th-century mosques